Dangsan-dong is a dong, neighbourhood of Yeongdeungpo-gu in Seoul, South Korea. In the west of this district, there are many flats for low income families.

Transport 
The area is served by subway via Dangsan Station ( and ). Also, various Seoul bus lines reach the street.

See also 
Administrative divisions of South Korea

References

External links
Yeongdeungpo-gu official website
Yeongdeungpo-gu map at The Yeongdeungpo-gu official website
 Dangsan-dong resident office website

Neighbourhoods of Yeongdeungpo District